Thomas James (c. 1573–1629) was an English librarian and Anglican clergyman.

Thomas, Tommy or Tom James may also refer to

Sports
 Tom James (rower) (born 1984), British rower
Tom James (rugby union, born 1987), Welsh rugby union footballer
Tom James (rugby union, born 1993), English rugby union footballer
Tom James (English footballer) (born 1988), English footballer
Tom James (Welsh footballer) (born 1996), Welsh footballer
Tommy James (American football) (1923–2007), American football cornerback
Tommy James (rugby league), Australian rugby league footballer

Politicians
Thomas James (died 1619), English politician
General Thomas James (1782–1847), trapper who served in the Illinois Legislature, was a General in the Illinois Militia, and served in the Black Hawk War
Tom James (Texas politician) (born 1929), American politician in the Texas House of Representatives
Tom James (Wyoming politician), member of the Wyoming Senate

Others
Thomas Lemuel James (1831–1916), banker and journalist who served as U.S. Postmaster General in 1881
Thomas James (sea captain) (1593–1635), Arctic explorer
Thomas James (minister) (1804–1891), former slave who wrote a short memoir
Thomas James (businessman) (born 1940s), American businessman, chairman of Raymond James
Thomas Naum James (1925–2010), American cardiologist
Tommy James (born 1947), musician
T. G. H. James (1923–2009), British Egyptologist
Thomas James (bishop) (1786–1828), Anglican bishop in India
Thomas Shadrach James (1859–1946), school teacher, Methodist lay preacher, linguist and herbalist
Tommy Lee James, American country music songwriter and record producer
Thomas Potts James (1803–1882), American botanist and bryologist
Thomas S. James Jr., United States Army general
Thomas L. James, United States Army general
T. P. James (Thomas Power James), publisher
Individualized Apparel Group, originally Tom James Company, American clothing company

See also